Castelnovo di Sotto is a comune (municipality) in the Province of Reggio Emilia in the Italian region Emilia-Romagna, located about  northwest of Bologna and about  northwest of Reggio Emilia.

Castelnovo di Sotto borders the following municipalities: Boretto, Cadelbosco di Sopra, Campegine, Gattatico, Gualtieri, Poviglio.

It is home of one of the most ancient carnivals in Italy, dating from the 16th century.

Demographic evolution

References

Cities and towns in Emilia-Romagna